Surat Mathur (22 August 1930 – 11 June 2021) was an Indian long-distance runner. He competed in the marathon at the 1952 Summer Olympics. He also won a bronze medal at the 1951 Asian Games.

References

External links
 

1930 births
2021 deaths
Athletes (track and field) at the 1952 Summer Olympics
Indian male long-distance runners
Indian male marathon runners
Olympic athletes of India
Asian Games medalists in athletics (track and field)
Asian Games bronze medalists for India
Athletes (track and field) at the 1951 Asian Games
Medalists at the 1951 Asian Games